Hugh Fraser Winsor,  (born 18 April 1938 at Saint John, New Brunswick) is a Canadian journalist, noted for his work with The Globe and Mail and CBC Television's The Journal. He received the Charles Lynch Award for journalism in 1998 and has been a Member of the Order of Canada since 2005.

Winsor graduated from Queen's University in Kingston, Ontario; he was a student there in the late 1950s and early 1960s, but did not formally graduate until 1973, due to late completion of one missing course. He later received an honorary doctorate from Queen's. His work with The Globe and Mail began as a member of that paper's Editorial Board in the mid-1960s, and he covered national politics for many years, into the early 2000s. His column, "The Power Game", was published there from September 1997 to June 2005.
Winsor was a director of the North-South Institute from its inception in 1976 until 1990.

References

External links
Order of Canada citation
The Globe and Mail: The Power Game Most recent columns by Hugh Winsor.

Living people
1938 births
Canadian columnists
Members of the Order of Canada
People from Saint John, New Brunswick
Queen's University at Kingston alumni
The Globe and Mail columnists